Trillium gracile, commonly known as the Sabine River wakerobin, slender trillium, or graceful trillium, is a species of flowering plant in the family Melanthiaceae. It is native to the region along the Sabine River in western Louisiana and eastern Texas. It generally grows in mature pine and hardwood forests, and on riverbanks.

Trillium gracile is a perennial herbaceous plant that spreads by means of underground rhizomes. The stem has 3 bracts in a whorl well above ground, each bract up to 8.5 cm (3.4 inches) long, the blades green mottled with darker green splotches. Flowers are solitary on each scape, purple with a musty-like fragrance.

References

External links
 
 Biodiversity Information Serving Our Nation (BISON) occurrence data and maps for Trillium gracile
 

gracile
Flora of Texas
Flora of Louisiana